The British Rail Class 321 are electric multiple unit (EMU) passenger trains built by British Rail Engineering Limited's Holgate Road carriage works in three batches between 1988 and 1991. The class uses alternating current (AC) overhead electrification. The design was successful and led to the development of the similar Class 320 and Class 322.

Today the class is operated by Greater Anglia. Some have been converted to Class 320 and are operated by ScotRail.

Description
Three sub-classes were built. The first two were built for the Network SouthEast sector for operation on services from London Liverpool Street and London Euston, while the third was built for Regional Railways for use on West Yorkshire Passenger Transport Executive services from Leeds. As part of the privatisation of British Rail, ownership of the class passed from British Rail  to the Eversholt Rail Group in April 1994.

They have been modified by the different rail companies which use them. The modifications include new seats, paintwork, lighting and passenger information systems.

The trains have been nicknamed "Dusty Bins" by some enthusiasts, after the TV game show "3-2-1" which featured a mascot called "Dusty Bin".

Class 321/3
In September 1987,  Network SouthEast ordered 46 321/3 units for use on services from London Liverpool Street to Cambridge and Southend Victoria. The first was unveiled on 15 September 1988. A further 20 were ordered later. Units were numbered 321301-366.

These units replaced slam-door Class 305, Class 307, Class 308 and Class 309 units on trains to Clacton and Southend-on-Sea, and worked services on the newly electrified routes to Ipswich and Harwich. They also displaced many Class 312 slam-door units, which moved over to the London, Tilbury and Southend line. Some of the Class 309s were retained until 1994, and 24 of the newer Class 312 units were retained long-term to work services to Walton-on-the-Naze and peak services to Clacton, Ipswich and Witham. Units carried Network SouthEast livery from new.

In March 2008, 321361 was named Phoenix at Ilford depot after it was rebuilt at the disused Colchester shed to repair damage caused by an arson attack at Southend Victoria on 10 July 2007.

The first of 30 321/3 units to be refurbished at Doncaster Works, as part of the Renatus project  which modernised the stock with features such as new air conditioning and heating, seating and Wi-Fi  was completed in December 2016.

Class 321/4

In October 1988 a second batch of 30 was ordered. It was intended that 25 be used on Great Eastern Main Line services and five on West Coast Main Line services, but in the event all were delivered to Bletchley TMD for use on the latter. A further 18 followed. Units were numbered 321401–321448. The first was delivered in July 1989.

These were built for outer-suburban services on the West Coast Main Line, from London Euston to Northampton, Rugby and Birmingham New Street. They displaced the then-recently cascaded Class 317s dating from 1981 which had themselves only just been introduced to the route to replace Class 310s.

Eleven 321/4s were transferred for Great Eastern Main Line services. Following this, their First Class area was reduced in size to standardise with the 321/3s in use on that route. This involved removing the centre partition and double doors and re-upholstering the First Class style 2+2 seats (which were retained then) in the de-classified area into the same fabric as the Standard Class seats. Later the First Class 2+2 seats in this de-classified area were replaced with the standard style 2+3 seating. These 11 were also fitted with a facility to lock out the power door operation within the unit (a basic kind of Selective Operation) to permit operation of 12-car trains on the Braintree and Southminster branch lines, where some platforms were only long enough for 8-car trains.

The 11 Great Eastern sets passed to First Great Eastern in January 1997, passing with the franchise to National Express East Anglia in April 2004 and Abellio Greater Anglia in February 2012. The 37 West Coast sets passed to Silverlink in January 1997, passing with the franchise to London Midland in November 2007. In 2006, 321407 and 321423 were loaned by Silverlink to Northern Rail while the 321/9s were being overhauled. In 2007, 321408 and 321428 were loaned by Silverlink to c2c operating services out of Fenchurch Street while one Class 357 was repaired and another was undergoing tests in the Czech Republic.

Following the delivery of the Class 350/2 fleet, 13 Class 321/4s (401–410, 418–420) were transferred from London Midland to First Capital Connect and overhauled by Wabtec's Doncaster Works. These passed with the franchise to Great Northern in September 2014. London Midland also released 17 (421–437) for transfer to National Express East Anglia. The remaining seven (411–417) passed to Abellio ScotRail in 2015, after being converted to three-car Class 320/4 at Doncaster Works.

In 2017, ten (402, 405–410, 418–420) were transferred from Great Northern to Abellio Greater Anglia. As at May 2018 the remaining three (401, 403, 404) are to be converted by Wabtec at Kilmarnock to Class 320/4 for use with Abellio ScotRail. Another two were to follow.

Class 321/9

The final batch of three Class 321 were classified 321/9 and were constructed in 1991, as an add-on to the main batches. These units had a similar formation to the earlier units except that there is no first class seating. They were ordered by Regional Railways for use on West Yorkshire Passenger Transport Executive services on the newly electrified Doncaster to Leeds route, entering service in 1993. From 1995 they also worked on Wharfedale line services from Leeds to Ilkley. In March 1997 they passed with the Regional Railways North East franchise to Northern Spirit, which became Arriva Trains Northern in April 2001. In June 1998 they were loaned to GNER to operate Leeds to London King's Cross services while its InterCity 225 fleet was grounded with mechanical issues. All three passed with the franchise to Northern Rail in December 2004.

The Class 321/9 units were refurbished at Hunslet-Barclay, Kilmarnock from late 2006 to early 2007. The refurbishment included a new livery, refurbished interiors and reliability improvements, similar to the Class 322 EMUs, which were also refurbished at Kilmarnock.

The units transferred to Arriva Rail North in April 2016, and then Northern Trains on 1 March 2020. With the Class 331s now in service, the Class 321/9s were transferred to Greater Anglia. They were leased to allow Greater Anglia's Class 360s to move to East Midlands Railway.

All 321/9 units were scrapped in 2022.

Current operations

Greater Anglia
First Great Eastern inherited all 66 Class 321/3 and 11 Class 321/4. The East Anglia franchise was subsequently taken over by National Express East Anglia, initially branded 'one', and then subsequently by Greater Anglia. A further 16 were added, upon release from London Midland. In 2016, ten of the sets formerly operated by Great Northern also transferred to Greater Anglia.

An additional three units, all Class 321/9s, were transferred to Greater Anglia from Northern Trains in 2020 in order to provide capacity during the introduction of GA's new Class 720 fleet.

These operated as four, eight or twelve-car sets.

In March 2023 it was announced that a farewell tour is planned for 29 April 2023.

Former operations

Silverlink / London Midland / London Overground

Silverlink inherited 37 of the 48 Class 321/4 units. In September 2003, Silverlink's class 321 units were temporarily withdrawn following the discovery of loose bolts on brake discs in some units.

In September 2004, London Euston to Birmingham local services were divided into two separate services: Silverlink retained London to Northampton services, while fellow National Express subsidiary Central Trains took over all local services between Northampton and Birmingham. Initially, Central Trains hired Class 321 units from Silverlink to work their new services, but the arrival of Class 350/1s meant that very few Class 321 units were then required.

To accommodate this sub-lease, three Class 321/3 units were transferred from National Express East Anglia to Silverlink. These were not permitted north of Rugby due to lack of the National Radio Network system (Eastern Region units only had the Cab Secure Radio System used for Driver Only Operated Passenger services) and therefore could not be used on Central Trains services (although they occasionally appeared on services to Rugby at weekends due to the line being closed between Rugby and Birmingham New Street). This ceased in late 2005 with the introduction of Class 350 trains on the Birmingham to Liverpool route. One of these sub-leased units was involved in a low-speed derailment at Watford Yard.

In May 2007, Central Trains began using Class 321 units on some morning services from Birmingham New Street to Walsall.

In November 2007, London Midland took over operation of the Class 321 fleet previously used by Silverlink and Central Trains. An order was placed by London Midland for 37 Class 350/2s to replace the Class 321s.

London Midland withdrew most, retaining seven units (411–417). They were used for peak hour workings between London Euston and Northampton and on the Abbey line. In 2015, all seven were withdrawn for transfer to Abellio ScotRail to operate on Glasgow suburban lines, with the last withdrawn on 20 September 2015. They were replaced by Class 319s. Two (413/414) briefly operated for London Overground Rail Operations in late 2015, being revinyled in London Overground livery. The cascaded Class 321s were reformed to three-car units, by removing the TSO vehicle and reclassified as Class 320/4s.

First Capital Connect / Great Northern

First Capital Connect received thirteen units (401–410, 418–420) from London Midland, following deliveries of the new Class 350/2s. The units worked on the Great Northern services from London King's Cross to Peterborough and Cambridge from December 2010 until May 2017. They passed with the franchise to Great Northern in September 2014.

All were replaced in 2016 by Class 387s, cascaded from the Thameslink route. Ten (402, 405–410 and 418–420) moved to Ilford depot for use by Greater Anglia, with the remaining three (401, 403, 404) converted to Class 320/4s for Abellio ScotRail.

Arriva Trains Northern / Northern Rail / Arriva Rail North / Northern Trains 

Arriva Trains Northern inherited three Class 321/9 units. These units operated on the Leeds to Doncaster Wakefield line service and occasionally on the Wharfedale and Airedale lines alongside Class 322 and Class 333s. All passed on to Northern Rail in 2004 and were refurbished in 2006/07. Having passed with the franchise to Arriva Rail North and Northern Trains, all were replaced by Class 331s with the last withdrawn in 2020. These have transferred to Greater Anglia for temporary use until Class 720s arrive.

Renatus project

In December 2013 Eversholt Rail Group rebuilt 321448 as a demonstrator at Doncaster Works for a proposed upgrade. It featured a new livery, completely refitted interior including two examples of sitting arrangements including 2+2 and 2+3, and a new First Class area. The demonstrator also featured air conditioning, not previously seen on Class 321 trains, along with fixed panel windows to replace opening windows and a new Vossloh Kiepe traction package.

The production run covered 30 units. The Vossloh Kiepe traction package was installed at Wolverton Works with the rest of the work performed at Doncaster. The first was completed in December 2016. In 2017 the prototype returned to Doncaster to be modified to the same specifications as the production units, including being refitted with hopper windows.

Future
After being awarded the new East Anglia franchise in August 2016, Greater Anglia placed an order for Class 720s which will replace the 321s despite the Renatus project. The first of the new trains entered service in November 2020.

The first two units were sent for scrap on 26 January 2021.

Swift Express
In March 2021, Eversholt announced its intention to convert 321334 for use as a parcels train. In July 2021, Eversholt and Wabtec revealed 321334 in the Swift Express livery. If successful further units could be converted.

In November 2021 it was announced that 4 more Class 321s would be converted to Swift Express, with the first of these units expected to be delivered in February 2022.

In 2022 it was announced that an unnamed customer had secured its first unit, later confirmed as Varamis Rail which launched a service between Scotland and Birmingham in January using unit 321334.

The final 2 units to be converted were expected to be finished in September 2022.

Battery conversion
In 2022 it was announced that Eversholt and Vivarail are working on a design to convert 321s to battery units that could last up to 30 minutes on battery power.

Aborted proposals

Hydrogen conversion

In May 2018, plans were announced by Eversholt and Alstom to convert a number of Class 321 units to run on hydrogen fuel-cells, as a way of replacing diesel-powered trains on lines that are unlikely to be electrified. The details of the conversion project, dubbed 'Breeze', were published in January 2019, with an expectation that units could be ready for service in 2022although this later slipped to 2024.

In November 2021 Alstom and Eversholt announced that they had decided to switch their primary focus to developing a hydrogen-fuelled variant of Alstom's Aventra EMU, on the grounds that the pool of convertible Class 321 units was too small to support the market they envisaged for hydrogen-powered trains in the UK, and that the Aventra's advanced technology and reduced requirement for routine maintenance were advantages in both manufacture and operations. Although the companies stated that they would maintain the "option" of converting existing trains in the future, the Breeze project was ended in the first half of 2022 and at least one of the Class 321 units selected for conversion (321448) was sent for scrapping.

Fleet details

Named units

321312: Southend-on-Sea
321321: NSPCC Essex Full Stop
321334: Amsterdam
321336: Geoffery Freeman Allen
321342: R Barnes
321343: RSA Railway Study Association
321351: London Southend Airport
321361: Phoenix
321403: Stewart Fleming Signalman King's Cross
321407: Hertfordshire WRVS
321413: Bill Green
321425: Bletchley Seven Silver Service
321427: Major Tim Warr
321428: The Essex Commuter
321439: Chelmsford Cathedral Festival
321444: Essex Lifeboats
321446: George Mullings

References

External links

321
321
Train-related introductions in 1988
25 kV AC multiple units